Jetta may refer to:

Automobiles
 Jetta (marque), a car marque by FAW-Volkswagen
 Volkswagen Jetta, a German compact sedan

People
 Jetta (musician), British musician
 Jetta (wrestler), British professional wrestler

Given name
 Jetta Carleton (1913–1999) American novelist
 Jetta Goudal (1891–1985) Dutch-American actress
 Jetta Klijnsma (born 1957) Dutch politician

Surname
 Kurt Jetta (born 1961), American consumer researcher
 Leroy Jetta (born 1988), Australian footballer, Essendon Football Club
 Lewis Jetta (born 1989), Australian footballer, Sydney Swans
 Neville Jetta (born 1990), Australian footballer, Melbourne Football Club

Other uses
 544 Jetta, an asteroid
 Jetta (company), an American company operating in the notebooks market
 Jetta: Tales of the Toshigawa, an independently created comic book
 Jetta, a fictional character in the TV series Clifford the Big Red Dog; see List of Clifford the Big Red Dog episodes

See also
Jeddah
Jeta (disambiguation) 
Jetter (disambiguation)